Coregonus trybomi is a freshwater whitefish in the family Salmonidae. It is a spring-spawning type of cisco, which probably has evolved from sympatric vendace (Coregonus albula) independently in a number of Swedish lakes. Only one of those populations survives, and it is therefore considered Critically Endangered by the IUCN Red List. The status of Coregonus trybomi as a distinct species is however questionable. By Swedish authorities it is treated as a morphotype or ecotype, not an independent species. It was listed as "Data Deficient" in 2010 but excluded from the national red list in 2015.

References

 
 

trybomi
Endemic fauna of Sweden
Freshwater fish of Europe
Critically endangered animals
Endangered biota of Europe
Taxa named by Gunnar Svärdson
Fish described in 1979
Taxonomy articles created by Polbot